Knight's tram, Raurimu was a bush tramway owned by the Tamaki Sawmill Co., Raurimu and managed by Len Knight (formally Benjamin Leonard Knight). It was located at Raurimu in the central North Island of New Zealand, connecting to the North Island Main Trunk Railway.

Locomotives 
 A & G Price, Type C 0-4-4-0, built 1912 with second-hand boiler and a twin vertical engine in the cab, used 1912-1922 B.L. Knight, Raurimu

See also 
 Raurimu Spiral

References 

3 ft 6 in gauge railways in New Zealand
Logging
Logging railways in New Zealand
Buildings and structures in Manawatū-Whanganui
Rail transport in Manawatū-Whanganui
Ruapehu District